István Márta (born 14 June 1952) is a Hungarian composer, theater and festival director, manager of the Zsolnay Cultural Quarter.

Family 
He has two children and two grandchildren. His wife is a ceramist.

Achievements 
 2011 - Managing director of Zsolny Heritage Management Nonprofit LTD. In Pécs
 2003 - Chairman of the Magyar Fesztivál Szövetség(Hungarian Festival Association)
 1998 - 2012 Director of the New Theatre in Budapest
 1994-96 Music Director of the New Theatre
 1990-92 Music Director of the Nemzeti Színház (National Theatre)
 1988-90 Music Director of  the Petőfi Sándor Theatre in Veszprém
 1989 - Director and Artistic Director of the multicultural festival “Kapolcs days – Valley of Art
 1989 - Editor in Chief of “Völgyfutár” (daily paper of the Valley of Arts)
 1985 - Organised various musical-theatrical actions, happenings (the contemporary music festivals Plánum and Randevú - Planum and Rendezvous) as well as Mozart Concerts in the Várszínház (Castle Theatre)
 1981-83 Teacher of Classical Music History and 20th Century Music Analysis on the Jazz Faculty of Bartók Béla Music Conservatory
 1980 - Several concerts with own works performed (Korunk Zenéje, MTV Vigadó Est, Varsói Ősz – Contemporary Music, Hungarian  TV Readout Concert, Warsaw Autumn)
 1980 Member of the Group 180 (both as a composer and an instrumental performer), member of Mandel Quartet, which plays historical music. As a member of the Mendel Quartet toured the United States, Mexico, Brazil, Israel, and various European countries several times.
 1973 - Field trip to Moldva (Romania) for collecting folk music
 1972-84 Organisation of various concerts and lectures (Music Section of Fiatal Művészek Klubja – Young Artists’ Club, Fiatal Zeneszerzők Csoportja - Young Composers’ Group)

Music 
 1979 Szöveg és zene – zenés színházi előadás Beckett rádiójátéka nyomán (Theatre evening in the spirit of Beckett)
 1980 Karácsony Napja – 24. lecke – kamaraegyüttesre (Christmas Day-The 24th lesson)
 1983 Szíveink – requiem töredék (Our Hearts- pieces of requiem)
 1985 Munkásoperett –musical (Workers’ operetta-musical)
 1985 Babaházi történet – zeneütőhangszerekre (Doll’s House Story)
 1986 …per quattro tromboni… - négy harsonára
 1989 Sóhaj (Doom.A Sigh) – vonósnégyes a KronosQuartet (USA) megrendelésére
	(piece for Kronos Quartetz)
 1990-98 Az Üvegfúvó álma (The Glassblower’s Dream ) vonósnégyes
 1983-97 Wyx-ciklus hangszalagra (WYX-pieces)
 1995 Scrabbles-music - kamarazenekarra
 1997 Liliomfi – zenés játék (theatre evening)
 2010 Sweet Cell Phone World (Operatorio for voices and network coverage)

Songs 

 1985 Vakok – kamaraegyüttesre és tenorra (Blinds)
 1996 Négy dal Petőcz és Szőcs versekre (Four songs inspired by poems)

Music for tape 

 1982 A múzeum hangjai (Voices of a museum)
 1984 Látomások-balett (Magyar Állami Operaház) (Dreams for Hungarian State Opera House)
 1989 Slips and stream-balett (Hollandia, Netherlands)
 1990 Blasting in the Birdcage (Németország, Germany)
 1990 Egy sikoly anatómiája (Anatomy of a Scream)-balett (Hollandia, Netherlands)
 1992 Szent Antal megkísértése (Temptation of Saint Anthony)- (Szegei Szabadtéri Játékok, Open Air Theatre Festival of Szeged, Hungary))
 1995 Don’t look back-balett  (Hollandia, Netherlands))
 1999 Musica Diavolae (International Association of Radios)
 2001 Támad a szél II. - The Wind Strikes II. (National Balet – Pécs)
 2001 Az ember tragédiája - Tragedy of Man (National Theatre)
 2001 A Falunk rossza – The Villain of our Village (New Theatre)
 2005 Történetek az elveszett birodalomból (Stories from the Lost Empires)- film music
 2005 El Camino- film music
 2005 Fire Music (“Time-trip” suite in 7 parts)

Theatre 

As a student at the conservatory and the Academy of Music He participated in several amateur and professional theatrical performances (such as Borbo, the 25 th Theatre and Thália). He composed music for the public performances of graduating students at the College of Dramatic Arts several times.
Since 1976 He have written over 300 theatrical and film scores, for the works of Tamás Ascher, János Szikora, János Ács, Imre Csiszár, Miklós Jancsó, András Jeles, Ferenc András, János Taub and many others.

Directions

 1991	Várszínház (Castle Theatre), Budapest – Opera of Kapolcs 
 1993	Arany János Theatre, Budapest – Lorca/Block, two one-act plays
 1996	National Theatre, Pécs – Cabaret, musical
 1997	National Theatre, Pécs – Fiddler on the Roof, musical
 2000	New Theatre, Budapest – The Demagogue
 2001	New Theatre, Budapest – The Villain of our Village

Other works 

Television, radio directions:

 1987 Kapolcs riadó – videoklip (MTV-BBS)
 1989 Templom – videoklip (MTV)
 1989-91 Képnaplók (MTV)
 1998 A vándor – rádiójáték (Magyar Rádió)
 1981-84 Az erdész levele, J. M. Wyx hagyatéka – két kiállítás

Awards 

 1979 Nivo Award of the Hungarian Television
 1982 Listeners’ Choice Award of the Hungarian Radio
 1982 Tribune International des Compositeurs Awards in Paris
 1987 Tribune International des Compositeurs Award in Paris
 1987 Erkel Award
 1994 Podmaniczky Award
 1994 János Déri Award
 1997 Decoration for Veszprém County
 1998 Theatre Critics’ Award for the music of Peer Gynt
 1998 Gold Medal of the President
 1999 Freeman of Kapolcs
 2000 Lovagkereszt Decoration of the Republic of Hungary
 2001 Pro Regio Award
 2002 Tisztikereszt Decoration of the Republic of Hungary (Civilian Section)
 2012 Középkereszt Decoration of the Republic of Hungary

Discography 
 Alte und neue Musik
Thorofon STW 831024 (1985) – LP
 HEARTS (Szíveink) LP 
Hungaroton SLPX 12563 (1985)
 Kapolcs riadó – Támad a szél 
Hungaroton Krém SLPX 17963 (1987) – LP
 Magyarország messzire van 
Hungaroton SLPX (1991) – LP
 AMADINDA (Babaházi történet) 
Hungaroton SLOD 12800 (1987) – LP 
Hungaroton Disc HCD 12855 – CD
 Black Angels (Doom. A Sigh – Sóhaj) - Kronos Quartet 
Elektra Nonesuch 9 79242-2 DDD (1990) – CD
 Looking East – Hungary (Blasting in the Birdcage)
Erdenklang AD LC 8155 (1990) –CD
 Tájkép – Jazz Bridge Series
Newsic RMKK 9304 (1993) – MC
 Works
Newsic- Hungaroton HCD 31580 (1994)  CD
 Hetedik (Dalok József Attila verseire –Hobo)
Insight 9070012 (1998) – CD
 Sound in sound out
Hungaroton HCD 31829 (1998) – CD
 The Wind Rises (re-issue of Kapolcs riadó – Támad a szél with titles in English)
ReR SD1, LC2677 UK (1998) – CD

Music sheets 
 Doll’s House Story – Babaházi történet
 Editio Musica Z. 13320
 „…. per quattro tromboni”
 Editio Musica Z. 13299
 Lesson 24 Christmas Day – Karácsony napja 24. Lecke
 Editio Musica Z. 13025
 Doom. A Sigh – Sóhaj

References
Hungarian references: 
 István Márta interview, László Valuska 
 CV
 Mozgó Világ Online - István Márta interview, Júlia Váradi
 István Márta interview, Norber Kustánczi 
 Fidelio - István Márta interview, Tibor Méray
 Eozin Magazin - István Márta videointerview 
 Displacement -  Zoltán Ágoston
 István Márta interview, Endre B. Mészáros  
 István Márta interview, Noémi Sümegi 
 István Márta interview, Máté Bóka
 István Márta interview, Attila Babos 

International references:
 
 Filmtied link to Istvan Marta
  Kronosquartet link to Istvan Marta

1952 births
Living people